Athibordee Atirat (born February 28, 1992), simply known as Aekk, is a Thai professional footballer who plays as a centre back or a right back.

Honours
Port
 Thai FA Cup (1): 2019

References

External links
 
 Profile at Goal
https://th.soccerway.com/players/athibodee-atirat/287978/

Living people
1992 births
Athibordee Atirat
Athibordee Atirat
Association football defenders
Athibordee Atirat
Athibordee Atirat
Athibordee Atirat
Athibordee Atirat
Athibordee Atirat
Athibordee Atirat
Athibordee Atirat
Athibordee Atirat
Athibordee Atirat
Athibordee Atirat